Timothy Insoll (born 1967) is a British archaeologist and Africanist and Islamic Studies scholar. Since 2016 he has been Al-Qasimi Professor of African and Islamic Archaeology at the University of Exeter. He is also founder and director of the Centre for Islamic Archaeology. Previously he was at the Department of Archaeology at the University of Manchester (1999–2016).

His primary research specialism is in the archaeology of Islam and indigenous religions in sub-Saharan Africa. His research has focused on the archaeological indicators of Islam, as well as indigenous beliefs associated with concepts such as ancestral veneration and sacrifice. He has engaged with STEM approaches throughout his research, and works closely with historical, ethnographic, and epigraphic materials. He has particular interests in the archaeological analysis of beads and bead materials.

He has curated several exhibitions and worked on theoretical approaches to the archaeological study of rituals and religions.  He has also led research projects in Mali, Ghana, Ethiopia, and Bahrain, and completed other field and museum-based projects in Eritrea, India, Pemba Island, and Uganda.

Personal life
Insoll was born in London and grew up in Richmond in southwest London. He is of part-Indian origin from his maternal family. He is married to the archaeologist Rachel MacLean, and they have one daughter.

Academic career
Insoll undertook his undergraduate studies in archaeology at the University of Sheffield from 1989 to 1992, before going on to work on his PhD at St John's College, University of Cambridge from 1992 to 1995. Having completed his doctorate, Insoll became a research fellow at St John's College, University of Cambridge (1995–1998), where he was also a tutor in Archaeology and Anthropology. Appointed as a lecturer at Manchester in 1999, he was promoted to the position of senior lecturer, and then reader in 2004, being awarded a personal chair in 2005, where he was professor of African and Islamic archaeology. In April 2016 he was appointed to an Al-Qasimi Chair in the Institute of Arab and Islamic Studies at the University of Exeter.

Insoll completed field research in Pemba Island (Tanzania, 1991), Gao and Timbuktu (Mali, 1993, 1996), Rakai (Uganda, 1994), the Dahlak Islands (Eritrea, 1996), Khambhat (India, 2000), Muharraq and Bilad al-Qadim (Bahrain, 2001 to present), the Tong Hills and Yikpabongo (Ghana, 2004-2011), and Harar and Harlaa, Ethiopia (2014–2020).

Two of his books have been translated: The Archaeology of Islam into Turkish (2007) and Persian (Farsi) (2022), and Archaeology, Ritual, Religion into Persian (2013).

He co-teaches the undergraduate Introduction to Islamic Archaeology (level 1) and Regions and Empires in Islamic Archaeology (level 2) modules, and contributes on Islamic and African archaeology to the MA module Themes in Archaeological Theory and Practice. Other undergraduate modules he has taught are Introduction to African Archaeology (level 2), Research Issues in African Archaeology (level 3), and the MA unit, The Archaeology of Rituals and Religions.

Research 
Insoll’s initial archaeological research was completed for an undergraduate dissertation on Chinese ceramics collected during surveys in Ras Mkumbuu and Mtambwe Mkuu, Pemba Island, Tanzania. This examined the typology, chronology, distribution and use of these ceramics within the context of western Indian Ocean trade.

From 1992 to 1993 Insoll completed his PhD on trans-Saharan trade and Islamisation in the city of Gao and its surrounding region in eastern Mali, research that was continued in 1996 as part of a post-doctoral fellowship. This was instrumental in providing archaeological confirmation for the pre-Islamic occupation of the city and contributing to the dismantling of the ‘Arab stimulus’ hypothesis where indicators of complexity were thought to be externally derived. Instead, long-distance trans-Saharan trade networks were found to have been added onto earlier regional ones. Islam was adopted within an indigenous context and due to an Islamisation process staggered over several centuries. The discovery of a cache of approximately 70 hippopotamus tusks suggested elephant ivory was not the sole source of ivory used in the medieval Islamic world. Source analysis (LA-ICP-MS) of gold indicated that coins being minted by the Almoravid dynasty in North Africa were struck from the same West African gold. Subsequent similar source analysis of carnelian beads, the first in-depth study to be completed on this material using Laser Ablation Inductively coupled Mass Spectrometry, indicated that some were probably of Indian origin, and others of West African provenance. An extensive survey of carnelian sources was completed in Gujarat (2000) in partnership with Prof. Kuldeep Bhan of MS University, Vadodara, to facilitate this analysis. The results of the Gao research were published in two monographs, many other publications, and presented in an exhibition, Medieval Trading Cities of the Niger: Gao and Timbuktu, in the John Addis Gallery at the British Museum (1998–1999), and subsequently formed part of the permanent display in the Musée Nationale, Bamako, Mali.

Also, in the 1990s Insoll completed a series of smaller research projects to assess Islamic archaeological remains in varied parts of sub-Saharan Africa which contributed to a major monograph, The Archaeology of Islam in Sub-Saharan Africa (2003). In 1994 whilst supporting Rachel MacLean in her PhD research in Rakai district, Uganda, he completed a survey of mosque architecture in Buganda, and of sites associated with the expedition of John Hanning Speke between 1861–63. In 1996, he undertook a survey of Dahlak Kebir in the Dahlak Islands, Eritrea, recording extensive quantities of surface scatters of trade ceramics, beads and glass, and a range of sites from Aksumite to Ottoman in date. In 1998, Insoll commenced the first modern excavations in Timbuktu, also in Mali. Excavations revealed material dating from the early eighteenth century onwards in a sequence of deposits of up to 5 m depth, and suggested earlier deposits were very deeply buried. Important information on later historical occupation was recovered including the use of a marine shell, Marginella, currency and on connections with the Fulani Caliphate of Masina in the 19th century.

In 2001 Insoll began his longest running research mission, the Early Islamic Bahrain project, sponsored by HRH Shaikh Salman bin Hamad Al-Khalifa, Crown Prince and Prime Minister of the Kingdom of Bahrain. This has involved excavations and surveys nearly every year since, with co-directors Dr Salman Almahari and Dr Rachel MacLean, and latterly, Prof. Robert Carter. The aims of the project were to reconstruct settlement patterns in Bahrain from the Late Antique period onwards, and evaluate archaeological evidence for trade, conversion to Islam, and the composition of the population over time. These aims are being achieved through identification of a sequence of major settlements occupied at different periods between the 6th and 19th centuries, and though exploring extensive archaeological evidence for trade contacts with Iraq, elsewhere in the Arabian peninsula, Iran, India, the Red Sea and Indian Ocean, and material manifestations of a complex and diverse community including African, Indian, and Christian elements that have been recorded. The latter attested by a large building, possibly the Bishop’s palace of the diocese of Mashmahig, recently identified and excavated in Samahij. The research has employed scientific techniques innovative in Arabian Gulf archaeology, as with micro-malacological analyses which indicated the impact of disease through identification of the vectors for Oriental lung fluke and schistosomiasis/bilharzia. The research has resulted in a permanent site museum in Bilad al-Qadim, an international conference Islamic Archaeology in Global Perspective in Bahrain National Museum (2017), and publications, including a study of all the Islamic inscriptions on Bahrain from before 1900, and an Archaeological Guide to Bahrain to encourage tourism. The project has had an impact in Bahrain where it has generated substantial interest in social media and via public archaeology days.

Between 2004 and 2013, and contiguous with the Early Islamic Bahrain project, Insoll directed research examining the archaeology of indigenous African religions in Northern Ghana, with a particular focus on the Talensi of the Tong Hills, and subsequently the figurines of Koma Land. This was completed with research partners Dr Rachel MacLean and Prof. Benjamin Kankpeyeng for the first phase, and Prof. Kankpeyeng for the second phase. The project was initially funded by the British Academy and subsequently by the Wellcome Trust. In the Tong Hills the research, though primarily archaeological, also involved analysis of extant material culture, particularly in relation to shrines, as well as oral history, medicine, and the processes of recording and preserving cultural heritage and architecture. The results indicated that shrines could have significant archaeological ‘histories’, encompassing up to 1500 years, were containers of memory, and could be widely franchised. Shrines also blurred the categories of natural and human constructed sacred spaces. Community engagement was vital and the process of negotiation with shrines through the agency of sacrifice, and with elders, priests, and other members of the Talensi population was a key part of the research. Scientific techniques such as organic geochemistry and isotope analyses were also employed by team members as part of research on indigenous medicine and its archaeological signatures. The results were presented through a conference in the Wellcome Trust, Shrines, Substances and Medicine in Africa: Archaeological, Anthropological, and Historical Perspectives (2009), and publications.

The use of scientific investigative techniques was expanded in the second phase of the research undertaken by Insoll to help in interpreting the meaning and role of enigmatic ceramic human and animal figurines and the mound contexts they were found within during University of Ghana excavations directed by Prof. Kankpeyeng. Computed Tomography (CT) scanning indicated that the figurines were manufactured either in parts or modelled as a solid object. Cavities were identified incised into them, particularly from the top of the head, mouth, ears, or nose probably for offering libations or for the insertion of other substances. Ancient DNA analysis identified three different types of plant offered as libations. The figurines suggested complex interpretations of agency and personhood had existed in the society that made the figurines, and they had functioned within indivisible frameworks of ritual, religious belief, healing, and medicine. Amongst the outcomes of the research was a booklet accompanying the exhibition, Fragmentary Ancestors, published to make the results accessible to a general audience. The research in northern Ghana also contributed to an edited volume, The Oxford Handbook of Prehistoric Figurines (2017), and a monograph, Material Explorations in African Archaeology (2015). His first research in Ethiopia (2013) was also completed for the same monograph, a survey of cattle modification practices amongst the Mursi undertaken with Dr Timothy Clack and Mr Olirege Rege.

Between 2016 and 2022, Timothy Insoll was PI on an ERC Advanced Grant funded project, Becoming Muslim: Conversion to Islam and Islamisation in Eastern Ethiopia (694254 ERC-2015-AdG). Initial funding for fieldwork in Harar (2014) and Harlaa (2015 and 2016) was provided by the British Academy and the Van Berchem Foundation. The ERC research team included ceramic, archaeobotany, zooarchaeology, osteology, and isotopic specialists and a project postdoctoral researcher, GIS specialist, Dr Nadia Khalaf. The project has established archaeological chronologies for Harar and Harlaa, both previously unexcavated, which show that Harar was founded subsequent to Harlaa in the mid-15th century as the capital of the Sultanate of Adal. Whilst Harlaa was established in the mid-6th century and abandoned in the 15th century. Harlaa was a major trade and manufacturing centre, with a particular burst of activity between the 11th and 13th centuries attested by material from a cosmopolitan range of sources, China, Yemen, Iran, Central Asia, Egypt, India, and across the Horn of Africa. Carnelian beads and marine shell were worked using South Asian derived techniques. Evidence for the presence of Muslims - mosques, burials, and dated Arabic inscriptions - occurred from the mid-12th century. Isotopic analyses of teeth from Muslim and non-Muslim burials suggested significantly different Islamisation processes to the Gao region with greater population mobility between urban and rural environments and less pastoralist conversion being influential factors. The research outcomes have been presented in numerous publications, and in a tri-lingual interpretative display, Harlaa - Lost City of the Medieval Sultanate of Harla, Ethiopia, installed in a community site museum at Ganda Biyo (Harlaa). A conference, Archaeological Perspectives on Conversion to Islam and Islamisation in Africa, and a special section in the journal Antiquity, “Cosmopolitanism in Medieval Ethiopia” (2021), also resulted from the research in eastern Ethiopia.

Recognition 
Timothy Insoll is a Fellow of the Society of Antiquaries and of the Royal Asiatic Society, and the Honorary Archaeological Advisor to the Court of the Crown Prince and Prime Minister of Bahrain (since 2001), and Honorary Lecturer, Department of Archaeology and Heritage Management, Addis Ababa University, Ethiopia. Previously, he was Honorary Curator of the Ghana Museums and Monuments Board (2017-2019), Visiting Professor, Department of Archaeology and Heritage Management, Jinka University, Ethiopia (2017-2019), and Honorary Academic Curator of African Archaeology at Manchester Museum (2014-2016). In recent years he has been an advisory board member, Islamic Galleries re-development, British Museum (2016-2018); a specialist assessor for the Cultural Protection Fund of the British Council (2016-2018); scientific committee member for the Institut du Monde Arabe (Paris) exhibition, Islamic Art and Architecture in Africa (2016); a member of the Ellerman Foundation Project steering group for research on and access to Islamic collections, Whitworth Art Gallery, Manchester Museum, and Manchester Art Gallery; on the advisory committee for the development of the new South Asia gallery at Manchester Museum in partnership with the British Museum (2015-2016);  and a scientific committee member (2013) of The Gold Route: Art, Culture, and Trade Across the Sahara Exhibition, Art Institute, Chicago.

He is currently on the editorial boards of the Annales d’Éthiopie, Antiquity, Ghana Social Science Journal, Journal of Islamic Archaeology, Journal of African Archaeology, Journal of Skyscape Archaeology, Material Religion, and Polish Archaeology in the Mediterranean. Previously he was on the editorial board of the African Archaeological Review (2000-2012) and joint editor of the series, Cambridge Monographs in African Archaeology (2006-2011). He has appeared in various media, particularly in relation to the destruction, protection, and restoration of Islamic heritage (e.g., BBC World News, Al-Jazeera, Australian Broadcasting Corporation, Radio France International, Canadian Broadcasting Corporation), his archaeological research in eastern Ethiopia (e.g., BBC World Service, The Daily Telegraph, Newsweek, Radio France International), and the relationship between archaeology and religion (e.g., BBC R4 and Voice of Islam Radio).

Academic partnerships and public engagement 
Insoll has developed partnerships with various institutions in Africa, the Middle East and India, notably the Institut des Science Humaines (Mali), the University of Ghana and Ghana Museums and Monuments Board, MS University, Vadodara (India), the Authority for Research and Cultural Heritage and Addis Ababa University, Ethiopia, and the Bahrain Authority for Culture and Antiquities. During the course of these partnerships he has worked closely and co-published with notable scholars including Dr Salman Almahari (Bahrain), Prof. Alemseged Beldados (Ethiopia), Prof. Kuldeep Bhan (India), and Prof. Benjamin Kankpeyeng (Ghana).

In 2021 he curated a community museum at the site of Harlaa in eastern Ethiopia that was installed in 2022, and co-curated the first permanent display on Islamic archaeology in the National Museum of Ethiopia in Addis Ababa, as well as an exhibition, The Benefits of Empire? 98 Euro-Colonial Images of Africa (2021–2022) in the Street Gallery, Exeter. In 2018 he curated, Remembering the Dead in Bahraini Shia Cemeteries (2018) also in the Street Gallery, and co-curated with Prof. Benjamin Kankpeyeng, Dr Samuel Nkumbaan, and Mr Malik Saako Mahmoud, Fragmentary Ancestors. Figurines and Archaeology from Koma Land, at the Manchester Museum (2013–2014). He also co-curated the sub-Saharan Africa section, with Dr Venetia Porter, of, Hajj. Journey to the Heart of Islam (British Museum, 2012), for which he collected Hajj artefacts in Mali. In 2017 Insoll also curated the permanent exhibition in the visitor centre at the Al-Khamis Mosque, Bahrain.

In June 2018 Insoll co-organised the conference Representing Africa in British Museums, in the Royal Albert Memorial Museum, Exeter, with Tony Eccles, exploring the themes of cultural representation, the construction of time(lessness), and historical ethnography, and in January 2020 organised the inaugural Indian Ocean World Archaeology (IOW-Arch) conference at the Institute of Arab and Islamic Studies, University of Exeter. He also co-organised the second IOW-Arch conference, again in Exeter, in December 2022. Insoll has also developed the successful widening participation masterclasses, Pots and Mosques: Explorations in Islamic Archaeology (2018) at the University of Exeter and, The World in Manchester. Exploring the Heritage of Islam, Asia and Africa through Objects (2002) at the University of Manchester.

International venues he has lectured at include:

 Tokyo National Research Institute for Cultural Properties, Tokyo, Japan (2022)
 Kanazawa University, Kanazawa, Japan (2022)
 , Belgium (2014, 2021) 
 University of Murcia, Spain (2021)
 Bahrain Authority for Culture and Antiquities (2021)
 Centre for Ancient Mediterranean and Near Eastern Studies, Florence, Italy (2021)
 School of Arabic Studies, Granada, Spain (2020)
 Centre for Material Histories of Islamicate Cultures, New York University (2018, 2020)
 Addis Ababa University, Ethiopia (2020)
 University of Tartu, Estonia (2010, 2019)
 Tsinghua University, China (2018, 2019)
 Peking University, China (2018)
 Shaanxi Normal University, Xi’an, China (2018)
 Trinity College Dublin (2018)
 , Belgium (2017)
 University of Bonn, Germany (2016)
 Leiden University, The Netherlands (2015)
 University of Bern, Switzerland (2015)
 Qala’at al-Bahrain Museum, Bahrain (2015)
 Bard Graduate Center, New York, USA (2014)
 Koç University, Istanbul, Turkey (2005, 2014)
 Institute of African Studies, University of Ibadan, Nigeria (2012)
 Obafemi Awolowo University, Ile-Ife, Nigeria (2012)
 Benaki Museum, Athens, Greece (2011)
 , Mainz, Germany (2011)
 Goethe University Frankfurt (University of Frankfurt am Main), Germany (2011)
 University of Bergen, Norway (2009, 2011)
 Columbia University, USA (2009)
 Syracuse University, USA (2009)
 University of Oulu, Finland (2009)
 University of Ghana, Legon (2008)
 National Museum, Ouagadougou, Burkina Faso (2008)
 Linnaeus University-University of Kalmar, Sweden (2007)
 University of the Witwatersrand, South Africa (2007)
 , Geneva, Switzerland (2004)
 Oriental Institute, University of Chicago, USA (2003)
 Lund University, Sweden (2002)
 King Saud University, Riyadh, Saudi Arabia (2000)

Bibliography

Books

Journal of Islamic Archaeology
"First Footsteps in the Archaeology of Harar, Ethiopia". Journal of Islamic Archaeology: 189.

References

Footnotes

External links
University of Exeter profile

British archaeologists
1967 births
Alumni of St John's College, Cambridge
Living people
British Roman Catholics
Alumni of the University of Sheffield
Academics of the University of Manchester
Academics of the University of Exeter
Manchester Museum people